Lieutenant general Willem van Rijn (29 December 1915 – 20 October 1997) was a Dutch military officer who served as Chairman of the United Defence Staff of the Armed Forces of the Netherlands between 1972 and 1973.

References

External links 
 

1915 births
1997 deaths
Royal Netherlands Army generals
Royal Netherlands Army officers
Chiefs of the Defence Staff (Netherlands)